Carlos Rodríguez (born 20 April 1978) is a Venezuelan fencer. He competed in the foil events at the 1996, 2000 and 2004 Summer Olympics.

References

External links
 

1978 births
Living people
Venezuelan male foil fencers
Olympic fencers of Venezuela
Fencers at the 1996 Summer Olympics
Fencers at the 2000 Summer Olympics
Fencers at the 2004 Summer Olympics
Fencers at the 2011 Pan American Games
Pan American Games bronze medalists for Venezuela
Pan American Games medalists in fencing
Central American and Caribbean Games gold medalists for Venezuela
Competitors at the 2006 Central American and Caribbean Games
Central American and Caribbean Games medalists in fencing
Medalists at the 1999 Pan American Games
Medalists at the 2003 Pan American Games
Medalists at the 2007 Pan American Games
South American Games medalists in fencing